The European Federation of Parasitologists (EFP) is a non-profit scientific international organization, founded in November 1966 by Witold Stefański who was its first president. It gathers around 30 national societies of parasitology of European countries. The original bylaws were published in the International Journal for Parasitology in 1979. Hundreds of European scientists are affiliated to the EFP through their national societies. The EFP is a member of the World Federation of Parasitologists . The EFP aims at helping human or animal health authorities in fighting any emerging parasitic problem.

Aims
The main objectives of the European Federation of Parasitologists are to promote the exchange of knowledge on parasitic organisms and diseases, to coordinate researches and networks related to parasitic organisms, to support of basic, veterinary & medical parasitology, to attract young scientists and students to develop researches in Parasitology and to organize a European Multicolloquium of Parasitology (EMOP) every 4 years. The European Federation of Parasitologists is registered in the EU transparency register ( ID: 68170229123-35)

Colloquiums
Eleven European Multicolloqium of Parasitology (EMOP) have been held so far :
 Rennes, France, 1–4 September 1971
 Trogyr, Yugoslavia, 1–6 September 1975
 Cambridge, United Kingdom, 7–13 September 1980
 İzmir, Turkey, 14–19 October 1984
 Budapest, Hungary, 4–9 September 1988
 The Hague, Netherlands, 7–11 September 1992
 Parma, Italy, 2–6 September 1996
 Poznań, Poland, 10–14 September 2000
 Valencia, Spain, 18–23 July 2004
 Paris, France, 24–28 August 2008
 Cluj Napoca, Romania, 25–29 July 2012.
 Turku, Finland, 20–24 July 2016, hosted by Scandinavian-Baltic Society for Parasitology (SBSP).

Awards and Scholarships
The EFP offers, during the EMOP, Young Scientist Awards to stimulate the involvement of young scientists in the development of parasitology in Europe. Awards are in two areas: "Research in Basic Parasitology" and "Research in Applied Parasitology". In addition, to help and stimulate the participation of young parasitologists to the EMOP, the board of the European Federation of Parasitologists grants scholarships to cover the registration fees.

References

External links
 Official site
 EMOP XII Turku, Finland 20 - 24 July 2016

Parasitologists
Pan-European scientific societies
Parasitology
1966 establishments in Europe
Organizations established in 1966